Rizal, officially the Province of Rizal, is a province in the Philippines located in the Calabarzon region in Luzon. Its capital is the city of Antipolo. The province is named after José Rizal, one of the main national heroes of the Philippines. It is bordered by Metro Manila to the west, Bulacan to the north, Quezon to the east and Laguna to the southeast. The province also lies on the northern shores of Laguna de Bay, the largest lake in the country. Rizal is a mountainous province perched on the western slopes of the southern portion of the Sierra Madre mountain range.

Pasig served as its capital until 2008, even though it had already become a part of the newly created National Capital Region since November 7, 1975. The provincial capitol has been in Antipolo since 2009, making it the administrative center. On June 19, 2020, President Rodrigo Duterte signed Republic Act No. 11475, which designated Antipolo as the capital of Rizal. The change took place on July 7, 2020.

This province is a part of Greater Manila Area.

History

Tagalog settlement arrived some time in the pre-Spanish period. The provincial territory began with the organization of the Tondo province and Laguna province during the Spanish administration. Some of the towns like Pasig, Parañaque, Taytay and Cainta were already thriving.

From the reports of the Encomiendas in 1582–1583, the Encomiendas of Moron (Morong) was under the jurisdiction of La Laguna and, the Encomiendas of Passi (Pasig), Taitay (Taytay) and Tagui (Taguig) belonged to the Province of Tondo. It was recorded that in 1591, the Encomiendas of Moron and Taitay were under the jurisdiction of the Franciscan Order in the Province of La Laguna; and the Encomiendas of Nabotas (Navotas), Tambobo (Malabon), Tondo, Parañaque (then La Huerta, Parañaque), Longalo (Don Galo, Parañaque), Tagui and Pasig were under the jurisdiction of the Augustinians in the Province of Tondo.

In 1853, a new political subdivision named Distrito Politico-Militar de los Montes de San Mateo was formed. This consisted of the towns of Antipolo, Bosoboso, Cainta and Taytay from the Province of Tondo; and the towns of Morong, Baras, Tanay, Pililla, Angono, Binangonan and Jala-jala from the Province of La Laguna, with the capital at Morong. This district was changed to Distrito Politico-Militar de Morong four years later.

In 1860, by virtue of Circular No. 83, dated September 2, 1785, the Province of Tondo became the Province of Manila. All its towns were placed under the administration, fiscal supervision and control of the Governor of the new province.

The town of Mariquina (Marikina) became the capital of the Province of Manila during the tenure of the revolutionary government of Gen. Emilio Aguinaldo. The Politico-Military District of Morong had for its capital the town of Antipolo from 1898 to 1899 and the town of Tanay from 1899 to 1900.

Creation of the province

On February 6, the First Philippine Commission sought to establish civil government in the country through a provincial organization act after the Filipino-Spanish and Filipino-American conflicts.

Therefore, on June 5, 1901, a historic meeting was held at the Pasig Catholic Church for the organization of a civil government in the Province of Manila and District of Morong, with 221 delegates in attendance. The first Philippine Commission, headed by William Howard Taft and composed of Commissioners Luke E. Wright, Henry C. Ide, Bernard Moses and Dean C. Worcester, discussed with the Assembly the issue of whether or not to write the Province of Manila with the District of Morong, was not self-sufficient to operate as a separate province.

Although the delegates from Morong, Hilarion Raymundo, and José Tupas, objected to the proposal, Juan Sumulong of Antipolo strongly advocated the move. After much acrimonious debate and upon the suggestion of Trinidad H. Pardo de Tavera the body agreed on the creation of a new province independent of the Province of Manila. The new province was aptly named after José Rizal, the country's national hero.

On June 11, 1901, the province of Rizal was officially and legally created by virtue of Act No. 137 by the First Philippine Commission which during the time was acting as the unicameral legislative body in the island of Luzon.

The new province was composed of 32 municipalities, 19 from the old Province of Manila (i.e. Cainta, Caloocan, Las Piñas, Malibay, Mariquina (Marikina), Montalban (Rodriguez), Muntinlupa, Navotas, Novaliches, Parañaque, Pasig, Pateros, Pineda (Pasay), San Felipe Neri (Mandaluyong), San Juan del Monte (San Juan), San Mateo, San Pedro Macati (Makati), Taguig, Tambobong (Malabon)); and 13 from the Politico-Military District of Morong (i.e. Angono, Antipolo, Baras, Binangonan, Bosoboso, Cardona, Jalajala, Morong, Pililla, Quisao, Tanay, Taytay and Teresa). The City of Manila from the old Province of Manila was treated as a separate entity. The seat of the provincial government was Pasig.

The number of municipalities changed with the municipal boundaries through time, mostly occurring within the provincial boundary. On October 12, 1903, the former municipalities of Bosoboso, Malibay, Novaliches and Quisao were absorbed by Antipolo, Pasay, Caloocan and Pililla, respectively, by virtue of Act No. 942. On November 25, 1903, Muntinlupa was ceded to the Province of La Laguna and became part of the municipality of Biñan, but was later returned to Rizal on March 22, 1905, and became part of Taguig until December 17, 1917.

On October 12, 1939, Quezon City was established, which included parts of Caloocan, and later on, Novaliches and parts of Marikina, Pasig and San Juan.

World War II
Marking's and the Hunter's ROTC Guerrillas operated in Rizal Province throughout the war.

In 1942, Quezon City and the towns of Caloocan, Makati, Mandaluyong, Parañaque, Pasay, and San Juan were merged with Manila to form the City of Greater Manila, by virtue of Executive Order No. 400 signed by President Manuel L. Quezon as an emergency measure. The city was dissolved by President Sergio Osmeña in 1945, thus restoring the pre-war status of the merged cities and towns.

Post-war 

Through Presidential Decree No. 824, Rizal was partitioned on November 7, 1975 to form Metro Manila. The municipalities of Las Piñas, Parañaque, Muntinlupa, Taguig, Pateros, Makati, Mandaluyong, San Juan, Malabon, Navotas, Pasig and Marikina, and the three cities of Caloocan, Pasay and Quezon City were excised to form the new region, while the other 14 towns remained in Rizal.

Contemporary history 
On June 17, 2008, Governor Casimiro Ynares III announced the transfer of the Capitol from Pasig. Its  capitol building, constructed in Antipolo by Ortigas & Co., owner thereof, was completed by December of that year. Built on a five-hectare lot at the Ynares Center, it employs 2,008 employees. The New Capitol was successfully inaugurated on March 4, 2009, bringing back the Capitol Building inside the provincial territory, from which it was absent for 34 years (when Pasig was incorporated into Metro Manila).

On June 19, 2020, President Rodrigo Duterte signed Republic Act No. 11475 into law, which officially transferred the capital of the Rizal province from Pasig to Antipolo. The law was published on June 22, 2020, and took effect on July 7, 2020. The publication of the law coincided with the 159th birth anniversary of Rizal.

Geography
Rizal covers a total area of  occupying the northern-central section of the Calabarzon in Luzon. The province is bordered on the north by Bulacan, east by Quezon, southeast by Laguna, south by Laguna de Bay, and west by Metro Manila.

Generally hilly and mountainous in terrain, most of the province's southern towns lie in the shores of Laguna de Bay, the country's largest inland body of water.

Talim Island, the largest island situated within Laguna de Bay, is under the jurisdiction of the province.

Climate

Administrative divisions
Rizal comprises 13 municipalities and 1 city.

Demographics

Population
Due to its location being in the heart of the Katagalugan, almost all of the residents of Rizal mainly speak Tagalog. English and Filipino are used as second languages respectively; Filipino is a version of Tagalog which is spoken by residents of Rizal in code switching & when speaking to Tagalog speakers of other dialects.

Religion
Roman Catholicism is the predominant religion with about 80 percent adherence, 2% are from Members Church of God International. Various Christian groups exist such as Oneness Apostolic or Pentecostal like UPC, ALJC and ACJC, Iglesia Filipina Independiente, Born-again Christians, Jesus Is Lord Church Worldwide, Iglesia ni Cristo, Jehovah's Witnesses, Baptist, Church of Christ of Latter Day Saints, El Shaddai (movement) Methodists, Presbyterians, Seventh-day Adventist and other Evangelical Christians. Muslims, Anitists, animists, and atheists are also present in the province.

Economy

Before the 1990s, the primary source of economy in Rizal province were the huge piggery estates owned by Manila-based families. In recent years, the province became one of the most progressive provinces in the country, owing to its proximity to Metro Manila, the economic center of the Philippines. Antipolo, Taytay and Cainta serve as the economic centers of the province, while Angono, Rodriguez, Morong, San Mateo, Tanay, Binangonan and Teresa are taking successful steps to urbanize areas within their jurisdiction.  Other areas of the province are having difficulty to start the urbanization process, mainly because of the lack of main roads to connect these to economic centers.

In a study recently conducted by the National Statistics Coordination Board (NSCB), Rizal province came out to be the Philippines' least poor province with a poverty incidence rate of 3.4%, even lower than that of the National Capital Region or Metro Manila. . On April 23, 2013, the National Statistics Coordination Board (NCSB) reported that Rizal, from being the least poor province in poverty incidence moved down to the 3rd Place, with Cavite taking over as the least province by 4.1% (compared to Rizal's 7.6%) and Laguna for 2nd with 6.3%.

Antipolo, the province's capital city, is the center of trade and exchange, tourism, government, and economy. It is also a center of education and sports because of the availability of various educational and physical training facilities. Acclaimed of its scenic attractions, the city also produces agricultural products such as cashew nuts and rice cakes. Taytay, the province's center of garment and textile manufacturing, is also the town where the country's largest mall operator runs a store near the town center. Meanwhile, Cainta serves as the center of business-process outsourcing (BPO) businesses in the province, aside from being known for the presence of several shopping centers and delicacies such as bibingka or rice cakes.

Points of interest

Government

The provincial legislature or the Sangguniang Panlalawigan is composed of ten elected members. Effective 2022, four members are elected from each of the province's first legislative district, two from the second district, and one each from the third and fourth legislative districts and Antipolo's first and second legislative districts.

Incumbent officials
 Governor: Nina A. Ynares-Chiongbian (NPC)
 Vice Governor: Reynaldo H. San Juan Jr. (PFP)
 Board Members:

Representatives

 Elected Representatives
 1st District: Michael John R. Duavit (NPC)
 2nd District: Emigdio P. Tanjuatco III (Liberal)
 3rd District: Jose Arturo S. Garcia Jr. (NPC)
 4th District: Juan Fidel Felipe F. Nograles (Lakas)

List of former governors

References

External links

 
 
 Philippine Standard Geographic Code
 Local Governance Performance Management System

 
Provinces of the Philippines
Provinces of Calabarzon
States and territories established in 1901
1901 establishments in the Philippines